The Parish of Sutton Forest is a parish of the County of Camden in the Southern Highlands region of New South Wales. It includes the land to the south and south-west of the small village centre presently known as Sutton Forest.  The northern boundary of the parish is the Illawarra Highway and part of Canyonleigh Road. Part of Paddys River is the south-western boundary. The Southern Highlands railway line passes through the parish and is near the boundary in the east. The Hume Highway passes through a small part of the parish in the north-west. The parish includes the towns of Exeter and Bundanoon. The town of Bundanoon is at the southern edge of the Parish of Sutton Forest, with the Parish of Bundanoon just to the south.

References

 
 New South Wales Parish maps preservation project
 Highlands NSW, Sutton Forest

Parishes of Camden County